George Williams, FRCP ( 1762 – 17 January 1834) was an English physician and librarian. He was a fellow of Corpus Christi College, Oxford, from 1781 until his death and he served at various times as the college bursar, vice-president and garden master. He was Sherardian Professor of Botany at the University of Oxford from 1796 to 1834 and Librarian of the Radcliffe Camera from 1810 to 1834.

References

External links

1760s births
1834 deaths
19th-century English medical doctors
English librarians
Sherardian Professors of Botany
Fellows of Corpus Christi College, Oxford